Ramkrishna Ghosh is an Indian politician. He is a member of Bharatiya Janata Party. He was elected to the Assam Legislative Assembly from 91 No. Hojai constituency in the 2021 Assam Legislative Assembly election.

Early life
Ramkrishna Ghosh is the son of Late Nani Gopal Ghosh. He is married to Aparna Ghosh, and they have a daughter.

References

Living people
Bharatiya Janata Party politicians from Assam
Assam MLAs 2016–2021
Year of birth missing (living people)